Zbigniew Tadeusz Ziobro (born 18 August 1970) is a Polish politician. He is the current Minister of Justice of the Republic of Poland, as of January 2019, serving in the Cabinet of Mateusz Morawiecki. He previously served in the same role from October 2005 to November 2007, simultaneously serving as Public Prosecutor General. He was elected to the Sejm on 25 September 2005 in the 13th Kraków district, running on the Law and Justice party list. He received over 120,000 votes in the parliamentary election, the highest percentage constituency results in the election.

Ziobro graduated from the Faculty of Law and Administration of Jagiellonian University. He did not complete his PhD. He was a member of the Lower House (Sejm) legislature from 2001 to 2005.

Due to his proclaimed "battle against corruption", he became one of the more popular, but also polarizing, politicians in Poland. His uncompromising approach and publicized prosecutions earned him the title Man of the year 2006, awarded by Wprost magazine. However, some of his policies were repeatedly characterized as partisan and overzealous by local and international press, including The Economist.

In 2007, former Minister of Internal Affairs and Administration Janusz Kaczmarek, allegedly linked to the Andrzej Lepper bribery case, was forced to resign. He subsequently made a series of attacks on members of the government, especially Ziobro. In a media confrontation with vice-PM Andrzej Lepper, Ziobro revealed that he had secretly recorded a conversation with Lepper.

In the elections to the European Parliament in 2009, he was elected in the Kraków constituency as an MEP. He received 335,933 votes, representing the second highest score in the country.

Justice Minister of Poland (2017–present) 
Since 16 November 2015 Ziobro has been the Justice Minister of Poland in the cabinet of Beata Szydło. In February 2016 he became Prosecutor General as well, which is result of new law unifying both positions.

On 20 August 2019 Ziobro's deputy Łukasz Piebiak resigned following allegations of "arranging and controlling" an online and offline smear campaign against judges critical of the government's efforts to put more political control over the judiciary. In private correspondence revealed by Onet.pl Piebiak claimed to be reporting his actions to an unnamed "boss".

Ziobro was the architect of controversial reforms to the Polish judiciary, which were condemned by the Court of Justice of the European Union. Ziobro has announced Poland can not comply with EU rulings. Ziobro has referred to EU rulings as "blackmail", saying Poland should not remain in the EU at all costs.

Political views
Ziobro is a Catholic Integralist. Believing that Poland is a Catholic nation and should be guided by traditional Catholic morality.

Ziobro is opposed to the Istanbul Convention against gender violence. In July 2020 Ziobro declared he will begin preparing the formal process to withdraw Poland from the treaty. He said that the treaty is harmful because it "requires that schools teach children about gender in an ideological way and de-emphasizes biological sex." In 2012, when in opposition, Ziobro had referred to the treaty as "an invention, a feminist creation aimed at justifying gay ideology".

Ziobro is against same sex marriage, with him saying in 2020 that it would be unacceptable for EU institutions to "force Poland to legalize gay marriage so it can get EU financial aid."

In March 2021, Ziobro justice ministry prepared a bill banning same-sex couples from adopting children, saying “This solution corresponds to the views of the vast majority of Polish society”, favoring the traditional family.

In August 2021, in the context of the years-long dispute between Poland and the EU over the Polish judicial reform, in particular over the Polish judicial disciplinary panel law, Ziobro said Poland should stay in the EU, but ‘not at any cost’.

See also
Rywin affair
Church of Our Lady of the Scapular

References

External links

1970 births
Lawyers from Kraków
Living people
Jagiellonian University alumni
Politicians from Kraków
Justice ministers of Poland
Members of the Polish Sejm 2001–2005
Members of the Polish Sejm 2005–2007
Members of the Polish Sejm 2007–2011
Members of the Polish Sejm 2015–2019
Members of the Polish Sejm 2019–2023
21st-century Polish politicians
United Poland politicians
United Poland MEPs
Polish Roman Catholics
Law and Justice MEPs
MEPs for Poland 2009–2014